Girls' Generation Complete Video Collection is the sixth music DVD and Blu-ray release from South Korean girl group Girls' Generation. It was released on September 26, 2012 in Japan.

History
The Blu-ray/DVD features all their music videos, Japanese, Korean and English, as well as performances from their first Japanese tour. It will be released in four versions; regular Blu-ray and DVD editions coming with a poster (first press only) and limited Blu-ray and DVD boxsets housed in a film can, including a bonus disc with interview footage of the members talking about their music videos, two deluxe booklets, playing cards, a mobile earphone jack, a ballpoint pen with a projector playing with a member's image (one randomly chosen between nine kinds), and 10 postcards. Comes in a large tin case (Diameter: 28 cm approx.). First Press Comes with Poster.

Track list

DVD 1 (Interview) [First Press edition]

DVD 2 (Japanese Ver.)

DVD 3 (Korean Ver.)

Chart performance
The DVD and Blu-ray for “Girls’ Generation Complete Video Collection” reached number one on the “Oricon Weekly DVD” and “Oricon Weekly Blu-Ray” charts, with 40,000 DVDs and 19,000 Blu-ray discs sold. This is the first time Girls’ Generation earned first-place rankings on the single and Blu-ray charts since their Japanese debut in September 2010. They are the first female artist or group to reach number one on all three charts — Oricon's Weekly Single, DVD, and Blu-ray Rankings — in the same week. The only other group to accomplish this same feat was Mr. Children, a Japanese pop rock band formed in 1988.

Charts

Sales and certifications

Release history

References

External links
 Girls' Generation  – Official Korean website

2012 video albums
Girls' Generation video albums
SM Entertainment video albums
Electropop video albums